Ohau Peak is a sharp rock peak 1.9 nautical miles (3.5 km) northeast of the summit of Mount Terror on Ross Island near Antarctica. The feature rises to c.2400 m and is central in three aligned summits 0.8 nautical miles (1.5 km) north of Mount McIntosh. Named by New Zealand Geographic Board (NZGB) (2000) after a peak near the locality of Tekapo (Tekapo Ridge, q.v.), New Zealand.

Mountains of Ross Island